Mankombu or Moncombu is a village in the district of Alappuzha in the state of Kerala, India. Monkombu, part of the Kuttanad delta region popularly mentioned as  'Rice bowl of Kerala'; is one of the major paddy cultivation regions of the state. Its unique geography embodied by Vembanad lake, inter-linked Pambaa, Manimala and Achenkovil river systems, gives rise to islands, back waters, network of waterways and canals, below sea-level paddy fields and  marsh. The farmers here have met the challenges of below sea-level cultivation over two centuries. Annual festivals, auspicious rites  and religious events at Mankombu Bhagavathi Devi temple, St.Pius church and Pope John Paul Church are occasions for social communion, rejoicing and celebration. Once a prosperous hamlet of hundreds of households,  Mankombu today is ravaged by climate change, pollution and dwindling population.

Rice Research Station
Alleppey-Changanasseri road (AC Road) opened up motor transport connecting hinterland to nearby towns and introduced farm machinery in wetlands, facilitated transport of farm inputs and harvested crop by road and gave boost to the economy. Mankompu is especially known for being home for the Rice Research Station of the Kerala Agricultural University. A unit of All India co-ordinated rice improvement program began here in 1974. It undertakes research and extension work  of plant breeding, soil science, crop protection and crop production.Rice varieties UMA, GOURI and JYOTHI developed here is well adapted to agro-climatic conditions of  Mankombu. The ancestors of Dr. M. S. Swaminathan, a renowned agricultural scientist, who is a known father of the Indian Green Revolution and the first winner of the World Food Prize, hailed from this village.

Temples
The Moncombu Bhagavathy Temple here is well known in Kerala and devotees pray for family fortune, learning and protection when going on a long journey. It was built during reign of king Veera Marthanda Verma of Travancore. According to one story, a high official  of Ambalappuzha Chieftain  was transporting logs of wood by river in a big country craft, when three damsels beckoned him from the banks and told they wanted to go  to  a sacred place. He agreed to let them travel along, provided they became plain-faced, to avoid a scandal. When they transformed themselves into ugly women, he realized they were Avatarams  and the party sailed  down river. When it reached near present day of Mankombu, it refused to move further despite huffing-and-puffing of punters. Then the plain-looking  women revealed their true Goddess form to the high official and wanted temples to be built  for future generations. After this divine revelation they were transformed into idols. For the first Goddess the place chosen was  Koyikkal, the second in  Vadaiattu. When they were considering where to consecrate the third goddess, she possessed a mendicant among the crowd who picked up a mango log ( Manka in malayalam) threw it up in the air with all his might and where it fell was declared the holy spot. This place was named Mankombu, meaning “Branch of a mango tree” and temple was built. Descendants of this holyman are custodians of  deity and enjoy privilege in the affairs of this temple. This temple was consecrated in the month of Meenam (March April ) in the star of Bharani. The founders day is celebrated during this occasion.   The temple is open for daily poojas and attracts thousands during propitious days determined by Malayalam astrology. An annual 7 days festival begins on 14 April every year. This is followed by the Pathamudayam festival on 23 April every year.

Etymology
Since the English name is an approximate transliteration of the Malayalam word, there may be ambiguity in the spelling. Moncombu is the spelling recognized by the Postal Department as well as in government communication. But yet other variants such as Mankombu is in use by the press.

Eminent Persons 
 Dr.M.S.Swaminathan - Agriculture Scientist  and Father of Green Revolution 
 Late Sri.M.K. Neelakanta Iyer - Chief Secretary of Travancore State  and Devaswom Commissioner and Sanskrit scholar 
 Dr.K.V.Krishna Das - Retired Professor Medical College & Hospital Trivandrum,  Author of Medical Textbooks, Farmer & philanthropist
 Late Dr.K.K.Haridas - Founder , Department of Cardiology, Amritha Institute of Medical Sciences
 Dr.N.N.Panickar -   Expert in Ocean Engineering,  philanthropist  and  co-coordinator of Nattukkuttam advocacy https://en.m.wikipedia.org/wiki/K._P._Sasidharan
 Late Prof K P Sasidharan - Eminent Malayalam writer, Professor of English literature 
 Sri. Beeyar Prasad - Poet , film lyricist , novelist and TV personality 
 Late Sri. M.K.Ananthasiva Iyer - Founder of ATGVHSS  Moncombu,  Government Pleader , philanthropist
 Sri. Moncombu Gopalakrishnan - Poet, film lyricist and script writer  
 Prof. K P. Mohandas - Retired Professor NIT Kozhikode,  author  and  social media campaigner 
 M.R.Narayanan - Expert in floating  structures and solar energy  
 Dr.Madhu Kumar - Former Registrar University of Kerala 
 Late Prof.Parameswaran - Professor of Zoology, SD College Alleppey

References

Villages in Alappuzha district